Mateusz Nowaczyk (born October 24, 1986 in Inowrocław) is a Polish footballer (midfielder) playing currently for Unia Janikowo.

Clubs 
 2004-2005  Zawisza Bydgoszcz
 2005-2007  Unia Janikowo
 2007  TKP Toruń
 2007-2008  Elana Toruń
 2008–present  Unia Janikowo

External links
 

1986 births
Living people
Polish footballers
Unia Janikowo players
People from Inowrocław
Sportspeople from Kuyavian-Pomeranian Voivodeship
Association football midfielders